Madhava's sine table is the table of trigonometric sines of various angles constructed by the 14th century Kerala mathematician-astronomer Madhava of Sangamagrama (c. 1340 – c. 1425). The table lists the trigonometric sines of the twenty-four angles 3.75°, 7.50°, 11.25°, ..., and 90.00° (angles that are integral multiples of 3.75°, i.e. 1/24 of a right angle, beginning with 3.75 and ending with 90.00). The table is encoded in the letters of Devanagari using the Katapayadi system. This gives the entries in the table an appearance of the verses of a poem in Sanskrit.

Madhava's original work containing the sine table has not yet been traced. The table is seen reproduced in the Aryabhatiyabhashya of Nilakantha Somayaji(1444–1544) and also in the Yuktidipika/Laghuvivrti commentary of Tantrasamgraha by Sankara Variar (circa. 1500-1560).

The table 
The image below gives Madhava's sine table in Devanagari as reproduced in Cultural foundations of mathematics by C.K. Raju. The first twelve lines constitute the entries in the table. The last word in the thirteenth line indicates that these are "as told by Madhava".

Values in Madhava's table

To understand the meaning of the values tabulated by Madhava, consider some angle whose measure is A. Consider a circle of unit radius and center O. Let the arc PQ of the circle subtend an angle A at the center O. Drop the perpendicular QR from Q to OP; then the length of the line segment RQ is the  value of the trigonometric sine of the angle A. Let PS be an arc of the circle whose length is equal to the length of the segment RQ.  For various angles A, Madhava's  table gives the measures of the corresponding angles POS in arcminutes, arcseconds and sixtieths of an arcsecond.

As an example, let A be an angle whose measure is 22.50°. In Madhava's table, the entry corresponding to 22.50° is the measure in arcminutes, arcseconds and sixtieths of an arcsecond of the angle whose radian measure is the value of sin 22.50°, which is 0.3826834;
multiply 0.3826834 radians by 180/ to convert to 21.92614 degrees, which is
1315 arcminutes 34 arcseconds 07 sixtieths of an arcsecond, abbreviated 13153407.

In the Katapayadi system the digits are written in the reverse order, so that the entry corresponding to 22.50° is 70435131.

Derivation of trigonometric sines from Madhava's table

For an angle whose measure is  A, let

Then

Each of the lines in the table specifies eight digits. Let the digits corresponding to angle A (read from left to right) be

Then according to the rules of the Katapayadi system of Kerala mathematicians we have

Madhava's value of pi 

To complete the numerical computations one must have a knowledge of the value of pi. It is appropriate that we use the value of  computed by Madhava himself.

A transliteration of the last two lines:

     vibudha-netra-gaja-ahi-hutāśana
     tri-guṇa-veda-bha-vāraṇa-bāhavaḥ
     nava-nikharva-mite vr̥tivistare
     paridhi-mānam idaṁ jagadur budhāḥ

The various words indicate certain numbers encoded in a scheme known as the bhūtasaṃkhyā system. The meaning of the words and the numbers encoded by them (beginning with the units place) are detailed in the following translation of the verse: 
"Gods (vibudha : 33), eyes (netra : 2), elephants (gaja : 8), snakes (ahi : 8), fires (hutāśana : 3), three (tri : 3), qualities (guṇa : 3), vedas (veda : 4), nakṣatras (bha : 27), elephants (vāraṇa : 8), and arms (bāhavaḥ : 2) - the wise say that this is the measure of the circumference when the diameter of a circle is nava-nikharva (900,000,000,000)."

So, the translation of the poem using the bhūtasaṃkhyā system will simply read  "2827433388233 is, as the wise say, the circumference of a circle whose diameter is nava-nikharva (900,000,000,000)". This calculation yields the value  = 3.1415926535922. This is the value of  used by Madhava in his further calculations and is accurate to 11 decimal places.

Example

Madhava's table lists the following digits corresponding to the angle 45.00°:

This yields the angle with measure

The value of the trigonometric sine of 45.00° as given in Madhava's table is

Substituting the value of  computed by Madhava in the above expression, sin 45° is found to be 0.70710681. This is accurate to 6 decimal places.

Comparison of Madhava's and modern sine values 
In table below the first column contains the list of the twenty-four angles beginning with 3.75 and ending with 90.00. The second column contains the values tabulated by Madhava in Devanagari in the form in which it was given by Madhava. (These are taken from Malayalam Commentary of Karanapaddhati by P.K. Koru and are slightly different from the table given in Cultural foundations of mathematics by C.K. Raju.)  The third column contains ISO 15919 transliterations of the lines given in the second column. The digits encoded by the lines in second column are given in Arabic numerals in the fourth column. The values of the trigonometric sines derived from the numbers specified in Madhava's table are listed in the fifth column. These values are  computed using the approximate value 3.1415926535922 for  obtained by Madhava. For comparison, the exact values of the trigonometric sines of the angles are given in the sixth column.

Madhava's method of computation

No work of Madhava detailing the methods used by him for the computation of the sine table has survived. However  from the writings of later Kerala mathematicians including  Nilakantha Somayaji (Tantrasangraha) and  Jyeshtadeva (Yuktibhāṣā) that give ample references to Madhava's accomplishments, it is conjectured that Madhava computed his sine table using the power series expansion of sin x:

See also

Madhava series
Madhava's correction term
Āryabhaṭa's sine table
Ptolemy's table of chords

References

Further references

For an account of Madhava's computation of the sine table see : 
For a thorough discussion of the computation of Madhava's sine table with historical references : 

Trigonometry
Indian mathematics
Kerala school of astronomy and mathematics